is a Japanese rugby union player who plays as a scrum-half. He currently plays for the Canon Eagles in Japan's domestic Top League.

References

1993 births
Living people
Japanese rugby union players
Rugby union scrum-halves
Yokohama Canon Eagles players
Sunwolves players